The Sudan women's national football team is the representative women's association football team of Sudan. Its governing body is the Sudan Football Association (SFA) and it competes as a member of the Confederation of African Football (CAF). The national team's first international competition was in 2021, when they played in the Arab Women's Cup.

Record per opponent
Key

The following table shows Sudan's all-time official international record per opponent:

Last updated: Sudan vs South Sudan, 20 February 2022.

Results

2021

2022

See also
 Sudan national football team results
 List of Sudan women's international footballers

Notes

References

External links
 Sudan results on The Roon Ba

Results
2020s in Sudanese sport
Women's national association football team results
Women's